Midfield Plantation, also known as Ellerbe House and Boineau House, was a historic plantation house located near  Boykin, Kershaw County, South Carolina. It was built about 1821, and was a two-story, hip roofed, frame dwelling on a high masonry basement. It had rear additions added about 1900. The original kitchen and smokehouse are still on the property as remains.

It was listed on the National Register of Historic Places in 1978. It has since been demolished.

References

Plantation houses in South Carolina
Houses on the National Register of Historic Places in South Carolina
Archaeological sites on the National Register of Historic Places in South Carolina
Houses completed in 1821
Houses in Kershaw County, South Carolina
National Register of Historic Places in Kershaw County, South Carolina